Wilhelm Lemke (27 September 1920 – 4 December 1943) was a Luftwaffe flying ace of World War II. Lemke was credited with 131 aerial victories—that is, 131 aerial combat encounters resulting in the destruction of the enemy aircraft. All but six of his victories were claimed over the Soviet Air Forces in 617 combat missions.

Born in Arnswalde, Lemke joined the military service in the Luftwaffe of Nazi Germany in 1939. Following flight training, he was posted to 8. Staffel (squadron) of Jagdgeschwader 3 (JG 3—3rd Fighter Wing). He flew his first combat missions in Operation Barbarossa, the German invasion of the Soviet Union, and claimed his first aerial victory on 26 June 1941. There, after 59 aerial victories, he was awarded the Knight's Cross of the Iron Cross on 12 September 1942. He was given command as Staffelkapitän (squadron leader) of 9. Staffel in November 1942. On 16 March 1943, he was credited with his 100th aerial victory. Four months later, on 28 July 1943, he claimed his 125th and last victory on the Eastern Front.

Lemke was subsequently relocated to the Western Front, where he flew in the Defense of the Reich and claimed six further victories. In mid-November 1943, he was appointed Gruppenkommandeur (group commander) of the II. Gruppe (2nd group) of JG 3 "Udet"; he was awarded the Knight's Cross of the Iron Cross with Oak Leaves on 25 November. Lemke was killed in action on 4 December 1943 northwest of Nijmegen in combat with United States Army Air Forces fighters.

Early life and career
Lemke, the son of a civil servant, was born on 27 September 1920 in Gundelsdorf near Arnswalde, in what was then the Free State of Prussia of the Weimar Republic (today Choszczno in Poland). He joined the military service of the Luftwaffe as a Fahnenjunker (cadet) on 15 November 1939. Following fighter pilot training, he was promoted to Leutnant (second lieutenant) on 1 April 1941.

World War II

Eastern Front
Lemke was posted to a front-line unit in 1941, almost two years after the start of World War II. His unit was 8. Staffel (squadron) of Jagdgeschwader 3 (JG 3—3rd Fighter Wing). In preparation for Operation Barbarossa, the German invasion of the Soviet Union, JG 3 under the command of Major (major) Günther Lützow was relocated east. Lemke claimed two Soviet Tupolev SB-2 bombers shot down on 26 June 1941—his first aerial victories. He was awarded the Iron Cross 2nd Class on 4 July 1941 and Iron Cross 1st Class on 20 July. On 11 July, his wingman and Staffelkapitän (squadron leader), Oberleutnant Winfried Schmidt was severely wounded in combat near Fastiv. Schmidt was hit in the lung by the defensive fire of a Tupolev SB tail gunner. By talking to Schmidt over the radio, Lemke managed to guide him back to the airfield at Polonne. The next day, Schmidt was replaced by Oberleutnant Franz Beyer as commander of 8. Staffel.

By 26 August 1941, Lemke had accumulated 15 aerial victories. On this day, flying Messerschmitt Bf 109 F-2 (Werknummner 8245—factory number), he was hit and wounded in the abdomen during combat with Soviet bombers but managed to make an emergency landing. On 3 November 1941, while convalescing, he was awarded the Honour Goblet of the Luftwaffe. He returned to active service on 17 February 1942 and was posted to 8. Staffel of JG 3 "Udet". On 31 March 1942, Lemke claimed his 20th aerial victory. He claimed three Lavochkin-Gorbunov-Gudkov LaGG-3 fighters shot down in combat with 6 UAG (6th Soviet strike aviation group—Udarnaya Aviatsionnaya Gruppa) on 4 April. He was credited with his 30th victory on 24 June 1942, and aerial victories 39 to 42 on 29 July. Subsequently, he was nominated for the Knight's Cross of the Iron Cross by his 8. Staffel. He was given command as Staffelkapitän of 9. Staffel in November 1942. He replaced Oberleutnant Karl-Heinz Langer who was one of the temporary leaders of the Staffel after its former commander Oberleutnant Viktor Bauer had been wounded on 10 August.

Lemke claimed his 57th victory on 7 September 1942, his 58th one day later, and his 59th victory on 11 September. The next day, he was awarded the Knight's Cross of the Iron Cross. On 27 December, he involuntarily rammed a LaGG-3 in combat. By 31 December 1942 his score had increased to 90 victories. As well as his aerial victories, he was credited with the destruction of aircraft on the ground, as well as three tanks, three fuel trucks, eleven other trucks, three Katyusha rocket launchers, one anti-tank gun, and two mortars. On 16 March 1943, he claimed his 100th aerial victory, a Lavochkin La-5 fighter. Lemke was the 35th Luftwaffe pilot to achieve the century mark. He was promoted to Oberleutnant (first lieutenant) on 1 April 1943 and to Hauptmann (captain) on 1 June. He was credited with his last victory on the Eastern Front on 28 July 1943, taking his total to 125.

Western Front and death

On 2 August 1943, JG 3 "Udet" began transferring to Western Front and flew in Defense of the Reich. The Gruppe arrived at Münster-Handorf Airfield the following day where they were placed under its new commander Hauptmann Walther Dahl. On 7 August, the unit for the first time practiced the Y-Control for fighters, a system used to control groups of fighters intercepting United States Army Air Forces (USAAF) bomber formations. Lemke claimed two USAAF Republic P-47 Thunderbolt fighters shot down on 17 August during the Schweinfurt–Regensburg mission, his first on the Western Front. By 14 October 1943, he was credited with one victory and two Herausschüsse (separation shots)—a severely damaged heavy bomber forced to separate from his combat box, which was counted as an aerial victory—over Boeing B-17 Flying Fortress bombers. On that day, he claimed his 129th and 130th victory, one of which was a Herausschuss, over B-17s on their second Raid on Schweinfurt.

In mid-November 1943, Lemke was appointed Gruppenkommandeur (group commander) of the II. Gruppe (2nd group) of JG 3 "Udet". He succeeded Major Kurt Brändle, who had been killed in action on 3 November. Lemke surrendered command of 9. Staffel to Leutnant Ekkehard Tichy and took command of the Gruppe a few days later at the Schiphol airfield, near Amsterdam in the Netherlands. He was awarded the Knight's Cross of the Iron Cross with Oak Leaves on 25 November, the 338th officer or soldier of the Wehrmacht so honored. On 30 November 1943 at 11:25, he achieved his 131st and final aerial victory over a P-47.

His mission was to lead an attack of 55 aircraft on a fighter intercept mission against USAAF fighters escorting Eighth Air Force bombers. He was shot down by P-47 Thunderbolts of the 352nd Fighter Group. His victors may have been Major John C. Meyer or Lieutenant Virgil Kersh Meroney. Lemke was buried at the German war cemetery Ysselsteyn in the Netherlands (Block CW—Row 1—Grave 24).

Summary of career

Aerial victory claims
According to US historian David T. Zabecki, Lemke was credited with 131 aerial victories. Obermaier and Stockert also list Lemke with 131 aerial victories claimed in 617 combat missions, 125 of which were on the Eastern Front and included 28 Ilyushin Il-2 ground-attack aircraft. Mathews and Foreman, authors of Luftwaffe Aces — Biographies and Victory Claims, researched the German Federal Archives and found documentation for 131 aerial victory claims, plus five further unconfirmed claims. This number includes six on the Western Front, including four four-engined bombers, and 125 on the Eastern Front.

Victory claims were logged to a map-reference (PQ = Planquadrat), for example "PQ 40873". These sectors were then subdivided into 36 smaller units to give a location area 3 × 4 km in size.

Awards
 Iron Cross (1939)
 2nd Class (4 July 1941)
 1st Class (20 July 1941)
 Honour Goblet of the Luftwaffe on 3 November 1941 as Leutnant and pilot
 Knight's Cross of the Iron Cross with Oak Leaves
 Knight's Cross on 12 September 1942 as Leutnant and Staffelführer of the 9./Jagdgeschwader 3 "Udet"
 338th Oak Leaves on 25 November 1943 as Hauptmann and Gruppenkommandeur of the II./Jagdgeschwader 3 "Udet"

Notes

References

Citations

Bibliography

 
 
 
 
 
 
 
 
 
 
 
 
 
 
 
 
 
 
 
 
 
 
 
 
 
 

1920 births
1943 deaths
People from Choszczno County
People from the Province of Pomerania
Luftwaffe pilots
German World War II flying aces
Luftwaffe personnel killed in World War II
Aviators killed by being shot down
Recipients of the Knight's Cross of the Iron Cross with Oak Leaves
Burials at Ysselsteyn German war cemetery
Pilots who performed an aerial ramming